Flight 7500 is a 2014 American supernatural horror film directed by Takashi Shimizu and starring Leslie Bibb, Jerry Ferrara, Ryan Kwanten, and Amy Smart. It revolves around a supernatural force on a plane. The film is loosely based on the Helios Airways Flight 522 incident that took place in 2005. The film was released in the United States on April 12, 2016, by CBS Films and Lionsgate, after being released theatrically in Asia.

Plot
Vista Pacific Airlines flight 7500, a Boeing 747-300, departs from Los Angeles to Tokyo Haneda. Passengers onboard include a group of two vacationing couples, Lyn (Aja Evans) and Jack (Ben Sharples) and Brad (Ryan Kwanten) and Pia (Amy Smart), who have secretly broken up; a thief named Jake (Alex Frost); a suspicious businessman traveling with a strange wooden box, Lance Morrell (Rick Kelly); a young woman named Raquel (Christian Serratos); newlyweds Rick (Jerry Ferrara) and the snobby Liz (Nicky Whelan); and the goth Jacinta (Scout Taylor-Compton). Air hostesses Laura (Leslie Bibb) and Suzy (Jamie Chung) welcome the passengers on board, and Suzy questions Laura about her secret relationship with the married captain, Pete (Johnathon Schaech).

A few hours into the flight, the plane hits turbulence that soon passes.

Lance has a panic attack and begins to bleed profusely from his mouth. When Lance suddenly dies, Captain Pete continues to Japan, moving the first-class passengers into Economy class and keeping Lance's body in the closed-off first class.

While dispensing drinks, Laura notices plastic water bottles collapsing and quickly warns everyone to fasten their seatbelts, as the cabin pressure drops. Oxygen masks are dispensed above the seats, but at least one does not work. The co-pilot falls unconscious. A thick smoke fills the cabin floor. After the cabin pressure returns to normal and the smoke disappears, Laura finds Raquel unconscious in the toilet and revives her with an oxygen tank. Meanwhile, the plane's radio has stopped working and Captain Pete cannot contact Tokyo air traffic controllers.

Jake goes to first-class to steal the Rolex from Lance's body when the body suddenly moves. He does not notice; when he pulls back the cloth covering the body, he is petrified by something the audience is not shown. Suzy finds out that Jake, and Lance's body, have both disappeared. When Laura notices an F-16 fighter jet flying beside their plane and calls the cockpit to inform Pete, he replies that no fighter jets are present. Brad's in-flight TV show (The Twilight Zone episode "Nightmare at 20,000 Feet") distorts and shows an image of Lance, while Liz is startled by a reflection of Lance on her laptop screen. Raquel returns to the washroom to do a pregnancy test and is relieved to find it negative. However, smoke begins to fill the toilet and a hand grabs her and pulls her into the floor.

The images of Lance appearing on their screens lead the group to search his belongings. Inside his carry-on are multiple tubes of hair with women's names taped onto them. They open Lance's small wooden box and find a "death doll," which Jacinta explains is a Shinigami — a being who collects people's souls after they die, but only if they let go of whatever is holding them to this world. Subsequently, Suzy informs Laura that Lance's death has made her realize she does not want to marry her fiancé, which in turn leads to Laura breaking up with Pete.

Laura searches Lance's checked luggage, entering the cargo hold through a small hatch. A hand emerges and drags Laura away. As Suzy waits for Laura by the hatch, another hand grabs at her. Suzy runs into first class, while a cloud of smoke follows her. The smoke quickly clears and Brad, Pia, Rick, Liz, and Jacinta rush to find out what is wrong. As Suzy walks towards them, one of the overhead compartments opens and she disappears into it. While the others rush towards the cockpit, Jacinta hears her own words and hesitantly walks towards an unknown figure which appears before her and hugs it.

The others discover Captain Pete and the co-pilot dead in their seats. They eventually, alone or with another, find their own corpses slumped in their seats. The entertainment screen in the cabin suddenly shows a breaking news story that Flight 7500 suffered a catastrophic decompression, and communication had been lost. The F-16 fighter jet that Laura saw earlier was sent to investigate the plane but found no sign of life on board. It is revealed that no one had survived the turbulence earlier and that everyone who has disappeared was taken after they let go of the one thing that had been tying them to the world. Brad and Pia accept their death and reconcile as the plane runs out of fuel and crashes into the ocean. Sometime after, Liz awakens to find the plane empty. She hears a strange noise coming from one of the waste bins, a discolored hand appears, and Liz ducks out of frame.

Cast

Release
In November 2011, CBS Films set the film, then known as 7500, for an August 31, 2012 release. Trailers ran in theaters, attached to screenings of The Possession. However, in May 2012, it was pulled from the schedule for a 2013 release date. The film was released on April 12, 2016, on video on demand and on home media formats under the title Flight 7500.

The film was released theatrically internationally in countries such as Philippines, Turkey, and Japan.

Box office
, the international gross for the film is $2.8 million.

References

External links
 
 
 
 

2014 films
2014 horror films
Films directed by Takashi Shimizu
American supernatural horror films
Films set on airplanes
American aviation films
CBS Films films
Films scored by Tyler Bates
2010s supernatural horror films
Films produced by Roy Lee
Vertigo Entertainment films
2010s English-language films
2010s American films